Labor Day fire may refer to one of the following:

2005 Labor Day brush fire, in California, which burned approximately 200 acres
2020 Washington Labor Day fires, in Washington state, which burned over 330,000 acres